Andrew Wells VanWyngarden (born February 1, 1983) is an American musician. He is the lead vocalist, guitar player and songwriter for the band MGMT, praised for (according to Interview Magazine) "an uncanny knack for producing pop music that sounds as if it were filtered through a kaleidoscope." One of his (and MGMT cofounder Benjamin Goldwasser's) songs, "Kids" (from the Oracular Spectacular album), received a nomination for the Grammy Award for Best Pop Performance by a Duo or Group with Vocals, while the duo was nominated in the Best New Artist category.

Biography
Andrew VanWyngarden was born in Columbia, Missouri, and grew up in Memphis, Tennessee, where he attended Lausanne Collegiate School and White Station High School. His father, Bruce VanWyngarden, is the editor-at-large of the alternative newspaper Memphis Flyer. Andrew fondly remembers his childhood years in Memphis, especially fishing and camping with his father. "I've always really liked nature and the ocean. My friends and I would go out with nets and make little aquariums with the creatures we'd find," he said. He was active in YMCA outdoors programs, and the family frequently went canoeing, camping, and fishing.

One of his first experiences with music was listening to his father play The Who song "Pinball Wizard" on his electric guitar with a Fender Twin Reverb amp. In seventh grade, he received a Les Paul guitar and immediately started playing. That same year, he won a contest at Lausanne, playing "Under the Bridge" by the Red Hot Chili Peppers. He was influenced by the music he listened to with his sister, Nirvana and Ween in particular, and often went through his parents' record collection in the attic where he found Neil Young, Bob Dylan, The Rolling Stones, etc. "From then on, all he ever wanted for Christmas was musical instruments; future seasons saw a drum set, a banjo, and a mandolin."

While in high school, he formed a band with Dan Treharne called Glitter Penis, where it was the two of them playing around on the computer "just making songs," VanWyngarden says. They created and recorded parody songs but did not perform live. Later on, VanWyngarden was in a band called Accidental Mersh with future MGMT guitarist Hank Sullivant who would later introduce him to James Richardson, MGMT's future live guitarist. The band achieved local success and fame in and around the Memphis area, and released two albums: The self-titled Accidental Mersh and Mirror Israeli. The first album reached the #2 spot on Napster's "Unsigned Bands" chart. The band went on hiatus when most of its members went to college. Andrew invited Ben Goldwasser to play the keyboard for Mersh during the summer of 2002. The band had a weekly gig at Newby's, but the shows were sparsely attended and the band dissolved. In college, he wrote and performed a song called "Super Volcano" for a class.

VanWyngarden attended and graduated in music from Wesleyan University, where he met fellow band member Ben Goldwasser in his freshman year. He said he planned to study the natural sciences of astronomy, but meeting Goldwasser changed his whole life course. He also mentioned studying entomology while in college. It was Andrew who initiated the formation of the group: "[Ben] wasn't really into it. I remember him saying he wanted to do some sort of social work, something noble for a good cause. I was like: 'C'mon, man! Where's your selfish ambition?'" Andrew (according to Q) remembered his University years as something "almost sickeningly idyllic: lots of doing mushrooms in the woods, not a hard graft in the library." 
He has said in interviews that "Kids" was one of the first songs they produced together, the song is included in the band's early EP We (Don't) Care (released under the name The Management).

VanWyngarden was on NMEs Cool List in 2008 at number 3, just below Jay-Z and Alice Glass.

Andrew came up with the title of MGMT's 2010 album Congratulations while making Oracular Spectacular. He writes a lot of the lyrics for MGMT, he has described the process, "I'd sit down for a few hours and try to do them. Usually, the ideas for the lyrics have been in my head for a while, and that's how I go over them again and again." His favorite song from the album is "Siberian Breaks." In a 2010 interview, speaking of fame and its effects on him, Andrew conceded that to some extent he's turned into a kind of character he was poking fun at in the debut album. "I didn't realize it until now, but it's kind of funny, because the first song on our first album was 'Time to Pretend', which was about the imagined rock star scenario. So, [the song] 'It's Working' is like, "Yeah, we went out there and we did a lot of drugs, and it's not that great".
Upon the release of Congratulations, he has cited his literary influences as being Leaves of Grass by Walt Whitman, The Ice Storm, The Anthology of French Poetry and authors such as Robert Anton Wilson and John Ashbery. His favorite pastime is surfing and says that in the future he would like to produce.

Side projects
Andrew VanWyngarden is in a project with Kevin Barnes from Of Montreal called Blikk Fang. In October 2014, it was announced that two songs would be released by Blikk Fang in Polyvinyl Records' 4 Track Singles Series for 2015. He appeared in The Heart is a Drum Machine, a documentary film about the nature of contemporary music.

In 2014, he released a solo track entitled "I Just Knew" for the surfing film Spirit of Akasha. He also released a cover of "I'm Alive", a song originally by Peter Howe.
 
VanWyngarden mentions Werner Herzog, David Lynch, and Federico Fellini as his favorite directors.

Personal life
VanWyngarden said that he is of partial Dutch descent. He has previously dated models Camille Rowe and Andreea Diaconu. VanWyngarden resides in Rockaway Beach, Queens, New York.

In March 2020, VanWyngarden endorsed Senator Bernie Sanders's second presidential bid.

On November 30, 2020, VanWyngarden released the Fanta Se EP under the DJ name Gentle Dom. In January 2021, Gentle Dom released a remix of "All About You" by The Knocks featuring Foster the People.

References

External links

 Official MGMT band

Living people
Wesleyan University alumni
1983 births
Guitarists from Columbia, Missouri
American rock musicians
Lausanne Collegiate School alumni
Musicians from Memphis, Tennessee
People from Queens, New York
American people of Dutch descent
MGMT members